David Acquah (born 4 April 2001) is a Ghanaian professional football who plays as a Centre Back for Hapoel Afula in the Liga Leumit.

Career 
Acquah joined Hapoel Nof HaGalil in 2020.

References

External links 

Living people
2001 births
Ghanaian footballers
Association football defenders
Maccabi Haifa F.C. players
Hapoel Nof HaGalil F.C. players
Hapoel Afula F.C. players
Liga Leumit players
Israeli Premier League players
Ghanaian expatriate footballers
Expatriate footballers in Israel
Ghanaian expatriate sportspeople in Israel